Wijnegem is a municipality located in the Belgian province of Antwerp. The municipality only comprises the town of Wijnegem proper. Wijnegem is one of the most expensive municipalities of the Flanders. In 2021, Wijnegem had a total population of 10,084. Wijnegem has the biggest shopping mall in the Benelux, the Wijnegem Shopping Center

References

External links
 
  Official website

Municipalities of Antwerp Province
Populated places in Antwerp Province